The name Roke has been used by the Japan Meteorological Agency to name three tropical cyclones in the northwestern Pacific Ocean. Roke is a male Chamorro name.

 Severe Tropical Storm Roke (2005) (T0502, 02W, Auring) – a Category 1 storm that struck the Philippines
 Typhoon Roke (2011) (T1115, 18W, Onyok) – a Category 4 storm that struck Japan in September 2011.
 Tropical Storm Roke (2017) (T1707, 10W, Fabian) – made landfall in Hong Kong as a tropical depression
 Typhoon Roke (2022) (T2218, 20W, Luis) – a minimal typhoon that did not threaten any land areas

Pacific typhoon set index articles